Janet K. Lockton (née Kimmerle; born February 24, 1942) is an American politician. She served as a member of the Connecticut House of Representatives from the 149th District for the Republican Party between 1990 and 2000, where she also served on the Legislators Nomination Council. She was succeeded by Livvy Floren in 2001.

Early life and education 
Lockton was born February 24, 1942, in New Jersey to Herbert (b. 1913) and Vivian Kimmerle. She was primarily raised in Millburn, New Jersey in Essex County. She has three siblings. Her paternal grandfather was born in the German Empire. She attended Bennett College in Millbrook, New York.

Politics 
Lockton served as a Republican member of the Connecticut House of Representatives from 1990 to 2000 for the 149th District. She was succeeded by her fellow ally and former campaign manager Livvy Floren.

Personal life 
In 1964, she married Stephen Hamrick Lockton (b. 1939), with whom she has three children: Curt, Tyler and Elise.

References 

Republican Party members of the Connecticut House of Representatives
1942 births
Living people
Women state legislators in Connecticut